In heraldry, cabossed, or caboched, is a term used where the head of a beast is cut off behind the ears, by a section parallel to the face; or by a perpendicular section: in contrast to couping, which is done by a horizontal line, and farther from the ears than cabossing.

In other words, heads may appear cabossed (also caboshed or caboched): with the head cleanly separated from the neck so that only the face shows; couped: with the neck cleanly separated from the body so that the whole head and neck are present; or erased: with the neck showing a ragged edge as if forcibly torn from the body. 

While cabossed heads are shown facing forward (affronté), heads that are couped or erased face dexter  unless otherwise specified for differencing. Heads of horned beasts are often shown cabossed to display the horns, but instances can be found in any of these circumstances.

See also
Erasure (heraldry)
Heads in heraldry

References 

Heraldry